Sarroux-Saint Julien is a commune in the department of Corrèze, south-central France. The municipality was established on 1 January 2017 by merger of the former communes of Sarroux (the seat) and Saint-Julien-près-Bort.

See also 
Communes of the Corrèze department

References 

Communes of Corrèze
Populated places established in 2017
2017 establishments in France